Evsei Grigorievich Liberman (2 October 1897, – 11 November 1981) was a Soviet economist who lived in Kharkiv, Ukraine. He is noted as the architect of the Soviet economic reform of 1965, also known as "Libermanism".

Biography 
Вorn in Slavuta, Russian Empire, in a wealthy Jewish family. Graduate of Kiev University, Faculty of Law, 1920, and Kharkiv Institute of Engineering and Economics, Machine-Building Faculty, 1933. He taught at the Kharkov Institute of Engineering and Economics, the Kharkiv V.I. Lenin Polytechnic Institute, and the University of Kharkiv. 

He proposed new methods of economic planning based on the principles of new democratic centralism. His dissertation took form in "Plan, benefit and prisms" published in Pravda (1962). This became a basis for the Soviet reforms of 1965.

His most notable works were "Structure of the balance of an industrial company" (1948), "Means to raise the profitability of the socialist companies" (1956), "Analysis of the use of resources" (1963), "Plan and benefits for the Soviet economy" (1965) and "Planning of the socialism" (1967).

Reforms inspired by Liberman unsuccessfully attempted to revitalize the Soviet economy during the 1960s.  Liberman's reform proposals were also implemented in East Germany.

Liberman's wife, Regina Horowitz, pianist and pedagogue, was a sister of the famed pianist Vladimir Horowitz. His great-granddaughter, Génia, is also a virtuoso concert pianist. In 1981, he died in Kharkiv.

References 
 From the Spanish Webpage, Biografias y Vidas

Bibliography 
 Михайличенко Д. Ю. Создание коллектива учёных-экономистов под руководством проф. Е. Г. Либермана и его деятельность в 1947—1959 гг. (К вопросу о теоретической подготовке экономической реформы 1965 г.) // Історичні записки: Зб. наук. праць. — Вип. 10. — Луганськ, 2006. — С. 105—111.
 Михайличенко Д. Ю. Всеукраинский институт труда и становление харьковской школы научного менеджмента (1921—1930 гг.) // Гілея: науковий вісник. Збірник наукових праць / Гол. ред. В. М. Вашкевич. — К.: ВІР УАН, 2012. — Випуск 60 (№ 5). — С. 100—106. 
 Михайличенко Д. "Дело" Е.Г. Либермана: 1938–1939 гг. / Д. Михайличенко // Гілея: науковий вісник. - 2013. - № 75. - С. 88-90. 
 Михайличенко Д. Ю. Недостигаемая эффективность: работы исследовательской группы Е. Г. Либермана на Харьковском машиностроительном заводе «Серп и Молот» (1925 1931 гг. ) // Научные ведомости Белгородского государственного университета. Серия: История. Политология. 2014. №8 (179). - С. 122-130.

See also 
 Kharkiv National University of Economics

1897 births
1981 deaths
Marxian economists
Soviet economists
Ukrainian Marxists
Ukrainian Jews
People from Slavuta
Academic staff of the Kharkiv National University of Economics
Soviet Jews